This is a list of universities in The Bahamas.

Universities 
 Bahamas Baptist Community College
 Bahamas Institute of Business & Technology
 Cherub College
 Eugene Dupuch Law School
 Institute Of Business & Commerce
 Omega College
 Southern College
 University of the Bahamas

Galilee College

See also 
 List of universities by country

References

Universities
Bahamas
Bahamas